Max Haufler (4 June 1910 – 25 June 1965) was a Swiss actor and film director.

Partial filmography

 Le règne de l'esprit malin (1938) - Criblet
 Farinet ou l'or dans la montagne (1939) - Gendarm
 Steibruch (1942) - Näppi
 White Cradle Inn (1947) - Frederick
 Madness Rules (1947) - Pfleger Weyrauch
 After the Storm (1948) - Fotograf Aichinger
 Palace Hotel (1952) - Hunziker, Oberheizer
 Heidi (1952) - Bäcker / Baker
 Uli the Farmhand (1954) - Karrer
 Heidi and Peter (1955) - Bäcker
 The Mountains Between Us (1956) - Federico
 Bäckerei Zürrer (1957) - Dicker - Plattenschieber
 Der 10. Mai (1957) - Neuenschwander
 It Happened in Broad Daylight (1958) - Tavern Patron
 Kinder der Berge (1958) - Alois
 The Cheese Factory in the Hamlet (1958) - Eglihannes / Ederhannes
 The Model Husband (1959) - Möbelträger Furrer
 The Man Who Walked Through the Wall (1959) - Herr Katz - der Gescheite
 Hinter den sieben Gleisen (1959) - Barbarossa
 Anne Bäbi Jowäger (1960) - Vehhansli
  (1960) - Barbarossa
 Town Without Pity (1961) - Dr. Urban
 The Marriage of Mr. Mississippi (1961) - Van Bosch
 Chikita (1961) - Dr. Markus Steiger
 Freud: The Secret Passion (1962) - Audience Member at Final Lecture (uncredited)
 The Trial (1962) - Uncle Max
 Anne Bäbi Jowäger - II. Teil: Jakobli und Meyeli (1962) - Vehhansli
 Miracle of the White Stallions (1963) - Engineer
 The River Line (1964) - Dubois, Lagerverwalter
 Geld und Geist (1964) - Dorngrütbauer
 Morituri (1965) - Branner

References

This article was initially translated from the German Wikipedia.

External links
 
 Museo Cantonale d'Arte, Lugano: Max Haufler

1910 births
1965 deaths
Swiss male film actors
Swiss film directors
German-language film directors
Actors from Basel-Stadt
20th-century Swiss male actors
1965 suicides
Suicides in Switzerland